The City of Sydney Library network consists of nine branch libraries and two 'library links', located in Australia within the City of Sydney Council administrational area.

History 
A free public lending library service has existed in Sydney since 1877 when the New South Wales state government opened a lending branch of the State Library of New South Wales on Macquarie Street. By the end of the same year there were over one thousand registered borrowers. In 1899 the lending library moved to the second floor of the Queen Victoria Building and in 1909 control passed from State to the City of Sydney Council. In 1918 the library moved again, this time to the old concert hall of the Queen Victoria Building. This provided space for a separate children's library to open in the same year. The first branch libraries opened in 1949 which also provided book deposit stations at a number of local schools. In 1970, the City library moved to yet larger premises within the Queen Victoria Building before taking up residence at 321 Pitt Street in 1984. High rent fees prompted it to move again in 1994 to Town Hall House. In 2005 the Town Hall branch moved to its current location at Customs House at Circular Quay.

Locations 

Customs House - 31 Alfred St, Sydney NSW 2000
Glebe - 186 Glebe Point Rd, Glebe NSW 2037
Green Square  - 355 Botany Rd, Zetland NSW 2017
Haymarket - The Exchange, levels 1 and 2, 1 Little Pier St, Haymarket NSW 2000
Kings Cross - 1/50-52 Darlinghurst Rd, Potts Point NSW 2011
Newtown - 8-10 Brown St, Newtown NSW 2042
Surry Hills - 405 Crown St, Surry Hills NSW 2010
Ultimo - Level 1, Ultimo Community Centre, 40 William Henry St, Ultimo NSW 2007
Waterloo - 770 Elizabeth St, Waterloo NSW 2017

Library Link

Town Hall House
Pyrmont

Collections and services 
In addition to the network's collection of over 400,000 books the libraries provide for
the loan of CDs, DVDs, magazines, newspapers, toys and non-English books. The libraries also provide internet,
copying and printing services.

In the Sydney Subject Specialisation Scheme, a Sydney-wide collection development policy which facilitated interlibrary loans prior to computerised union catalogues, the City of Sydney Library maintained a focus on life sciences, engineering and French literature.

The City of Sydney library had a total stock of 461,253 items as of June 2015.

Library Link 
A Library Link has existed in Town Hall House, close to the location of the library's previous premises, since its relocation to Customs House in 2005. The Library Link makes available a number of current newspapers and magazines, a fiction collection, a self-operated check-in and check-out machine and a telephone to contact library staff. Members can pick up books and other material held at other branches at the Library Link by contacting staff. In 2006 a link opened at Pyrmont offering a limited services.  People are able to drop off books and pick up items they have asked for during the time that the volunteers are there.

Membership 
The library network has around 40,000 active members and processes 1,350,000 loans per year.
Membership of the library network is free to residents of the City of Sydney local government area and residents of New South Wales.

References

External links 
City of Sydney Library

Libraries in Sydney
Public libraries in Australia
Government of Sydney
Libraries established in 1908
1908 establishments in Australia